The internal–external distinction is a distinction used in philosophy to divide an ontology into two parts: an internal part concerning observation related to philosophy, and an external part concerning question related to philosophy.

Linguistic framework
 Rudolf Carnap introduced the idea of a 'linguistic framework' or a 'form of language' that uses a precise specification of the definitions of and the relations between ontological entities. The discussion of a proposition within a framework can take on a logical or an empirical (that is, factual) aspect. The logical aspect concerns whether the proposition respects the definitions and rules set up in the framework. The empirical aspect concerns the application of the framework in some or another practical situation.

The utility of a linguistic framework constitutes issues that Carnap calls 'external' or 'pragmatic'.
{{quote|“To be sure, we have to face at this point an important question; but it is a practical, not a theoretical question; it is the question of whether or not to accept the new linguistic forms. The acceptance cannot be judged as being either true or false because it is not an assertion. It can only be judged as being more or less expedient, fruitful, conducive to the aim for which the language is intended. Judgments of this kind supply the motivation for the decision of accepting or rejecting the kind of entities.”|Rudolf Carnap|"Empiricism, Semantics, and Ontology"}}

The distinction between 'internal' and 'external' arguments is not as obvious as it might appear. Clearly the question of utility is not completely separable from the way a linguistic framework is organized. A more formal statement of the internal-external difference is provided by Myhill:

Quine's critique
Quine disputed Carnap's position from several points of view. His most famous criticism of Carnap was Two dogmas of empiricism, but this work is not directed at the internal-external distinction but at the analytic-synthetic distinction brought up by Carnap in his work on logic: Meaning and Necessity. Quine's criticism of the internal-external distinction is found in his works On Carnap's views on Ontology and Word and Object.

Quine's approach to the internal-external division was to cast internal questions as subclass questions and external questions as category questions. What Quine meant by 'subclass' questions were questions like "what are so-and-so's?" where the answers are restricted to lie within a specific linguistic framework. On the other hand, 'category' questions were questions like "what are so-and-so's?"  asked outside any specific language where the answers are not so-restricted. The term subclass arises as follows: Quine supposes that a particular linguistic framework selects from a broad category of meanings for a term, say furniture, a particular or subclass of meanings, say chairs.

Quine argued that there is always possible an overarching language that encompasses both types of question and the distinction between the two types is artificial.

So we can switch back and forth from internal to external questions just by a shift of vocabulary. As Thomasson puts it, if our language refers to 'things' we can ask of all the things there are, are any of them numbers; while if our language includes only 'numbers', we can ask only narrower questions like whether any numbers are prime numbers. In other words, Quine's position is that "Carnap's main objection to metaphysics rests on an unsupported premise, namely the assumption that there is some sort of principled plurality in language which blocks Quine's move to homogenize the existential quantifier." "What is to stop us treating all ontological issues as internal questions within a single grand framework?"

Later views
A view close to Quine’s subclass/category description is called ‘’conceptual relativity’’. To describe conceptual relativity, Putnam points out that while the pages of a book are regarded as part of book when they are attached, they are things-in-themselves if they are detached. My nose is only part of an object, my person. On the other hand, is my nose the same as the collection of atoms or molecules forming it? This arbitrariness of language is called conceptual relativity, a matter of conventions. The point is made that if one wishes to refer only to 'pages', then books may not exist, and vice versa if one wishes to admit only to books. Thus, in this view, the Carnapian multiplicity of possible linguistic frameworks proposes a variety of 'realities' and the prospect of choosing between them, a form of what is called ontological pluralism, or multiple realities.  The notion of 'one reality' behind our everyday perceptions is common in everyday life, and some find it unsettling that what 'exists' might be a matter of what language one chooses to use.

A related idea is quantifier variance. Loosely speaking a 'quantifier expression' is just a function that says there exists at least one such-and-such. Then 'quantifier variance' combines the notion that the same object can have different names, so the quantifier may refer to the same thing even though different names are employed by it, and the notion that quantifier expressions can be formed in a variety of ways. Hirsch says this arbitrariness over what 'exists' is a quandary only due to Putnam's formulation, and it is resolved by turning things upside down and saying things that exist can have different names. In other words, Hirsch agrees with Quine that there is an overarching language that we can adapt to different situations. The Carnapian internal/external distinction in this view, as with the subclass/category distinction, is just a matter of language, and has nothing to do with 'reality'.

More recently, some philosophers have stressed that the real issue is not one of language as such, but the difference between questions asked using a linguistic framework and those asked somehow before the adoption of a linguistic framework, the difference between questions about the construction and rules of a framework, and questions about the decision whether to use a framework. This distinction is called by Thomasson and Price the difference between ‘’using’’ a term and ‘’mentioning’’ a term. As Price notes, Carnap holds that there is a mistake involved in "assimilating issues of the existence of numbers (say) and of the existence of physical objects...the distinctions in question are not grounded at the syntactical level." Price suggests a connection with Ryle's view of different functions of language:

Although not supporting an entire lack of distinction like the subclass/category view of Quine, as a pragmatic issue, the use/mention distinction still does not provide a sharp division between the issues of forming and conceptualizing a framework and deciding whether to adopt it: each informs the other. An example is the well-known tension between mathematicians and physicists, the one group very concerned over questions of logic and rigor, and the other inclined to sacrifice a bit of rigor to explain observations.

One approach to selecting a framework is based upon an examination of the conceptual relations between entities in a framework, which entities are more 'fundamental'. One framework may then 'include' another because the entities in one framework apparently can be derived from or 'supervene' upon those in the more fundamental one.  While Carnap claims such decisions are pragmatic in nature, external questions with no philosophical importance, Schaffer suggests we avoid this formulation. Instead, we should go back to Aristotle and look upon nature as hierarchical, and pursue philosophical diagnostics'': that is, examination of criteria for what is fundamental and what relations exist between all entities and these fundamental ones. But "how can we discover what grounds what?...questions regarding not only what grounds what, but also what the grounding consists in, and how one may discover or discern grounding facts, seem to be part of an emerging set of relational research problems in metaphysics."

See also
Analytic-synthetic distinction
Anti-realism
Indeterminacy of translation
Logical positivism
Meta-ontology
Mereology
Model-dependent realism
Ordinary language philosophy
Philosophical realism
Benj Hellie's Vertiginous question

References

Concepts in metaphysics
Ontology
Meaning (philosophy of language)